Robert Anthony Dougall (born 7 September 1951) is a South African former racing driver.

Racing record

Complete European Formula Two Championship results
(key) (Races in bold indicate pole position; races in italics indicate fastest lap)

Complete British Saloon Car Championship results
(key) (Races in bold indicate pole position; races in italics indicate fastest lap.)

† Events with 2 races staged for the different classes.

References

1951 births
Living people
South African racing drivers
European Formula Two Championship drivers
24 Hours of Le Mans drivers
British Touring Car Championship drivers